Martin Karlsson (born April 26, 1952) is a retired Swedish ice hockey centre and currently the head coach of AaB Ishockey. As a player, he won the Swedish National Championship for three consecutive seasons, with Brynäs IF in 1976 and 1977 and with Skellefteå AIK in 1978. Karlsson was also the Elitserien scoring leader in the 1977–78 season. He has coached AaB Ishockey, Nordsjælland Cobras, EC Red Bull Salzburg, and IF Troja/Ljungby. He coached IF Troja/Ljungby from 2007 to 2011 before returning to AaB Ishockey in the 2011–12 season as the team's head coach.

Career statistics

International resume
World Championships silver: 1977
World Championships bronze: 1976

References

1952 births
Living people
Brynäs IF players
IF Troja/Ljungby players
Skellefteå AIK players
Swedish ice hockey centres
People from Skellefteå Municipality
Sportspeople from Västerbotten County